Palaeoloxodon huaihoensis is an extinct species of elephant belonging to the genus Palaeoloxodon known from the Pleistocene of China. It was first named a subspecies of P. naumanni (which is principly known from material found in Japan) by J. Liu in 1977 based off a partial skeleton from Huaiyuan, Anhui, and was later elevated to species rank by G. Qi in 1999, who also included remains found in the Penghu Channel between the Penghu archipelago and Taiwan. A mostly complete adult skull (IVPP V4443) from Late Pleistoene Nihewan basin in Hebei may be referrable to this species. The body size is very large, comparable to Indian P. namadicus and European P. antiquus. In comparison to Indian P. namadicus, the postcranial skeleton is substantially more robust, and greatly resembles that of P. antiquus. The morphology of IVPP V4443 is also overall more similar to that of P. antiquus than P. namadicus, but the parietal-occipital crest at the top of the skull displays a very robust morphology closer to that of P. namadicus.

References 

huaihoensis
Pleistocene proboscideans
Pleistocene species
Pleistocene mammals of Asia